Guazi, also called kwasi refers to roasted plant seeds. It is a popular snack in China, Malaysia and overseas Chinese communities, especially in Indonesia. While directly translated as "melon seeds" it usually refers to baked seeds of the sunflower, pumpkin, or watermelon seeds. It is often served as an appetizer during banquets.

History 
The oldest documentation of the consumption of guazi is recorded in the Taiping Huanyu Ji though it is unclear what specific variety of seed was eaten. 
Watermelon seeds were the earliest to be consumed in China during the Tang dynasty and only became widespread during the Ming and Qing dynasties.

The Wanli Emperor was described by Liu Ruoyu in the Zhuo Zhong Zhi to have “loved eating fresh watermelon seeds baked with salt.”

There is a folk song from the late Ming that described a girl gifting a bag of shelled seeds to her lover.

Consumption of pumpkin and sunflower seeds was only commonplace after the Qing.

Feng Zikai observed the popularity of eating seeds during his life writing his book, Eating Guazi, on the matter.

Quan Yanchi wrote in his book, Leaders Around the Dining Table, how Mao Zedong and Liu Shaoqi enjoyed eating guazi.

Idiom 
The process of shelling each seed in order to eat the food is time-consuming for a relatively minimal amount of substance. The task was viewed as wasteful and became a phrase that symbolized killing or wasting time. It would often be used in context of wasting taxpayer money.

Varieties 
 Sunflower seed
 Pumpkin seed
 Watermelon seed

See also

Chinese cuisine
Indonesian cuisine

References

Snack foods
Chinese cuisine
Indonesian cuisine
Malaysian cuisine